Allen Peake (born February 17, 1961) is an American politician. He previously served as a member of the Georgia House of Representatives from the 141st District, serving from 2007 until Jan. 14, 2019. He is a member of the Republican party.

Allen Peake is also the CEO of a restaurant franchise business and distributes marijuana extracts to Georgia residents who are allowed to possess marijuana but cannot obtain it legally.

References

Living people
Republican Party members of the Georgia House of Representatives
1961 births
People from Macon, Georgia
21st-century American politicians